633 17th Street, formerly known as the First Interstate Tower North, is a high-rise building in Denver, Colorado. The building stands as the twelfth-tallest building in Denver and Colorado. It also stood as the tallest building in the city at the time of its 1974 completion, and held that distinction for four years until it was surpassed by the  555 17th Street in 1978.

At the time of its completion, 633 17th Street was known as "First Interstate Tower North" after First Interstate Bancorp, its primary tenant. After First Interstate merged with Wells Fargo in 1996, the building's address became its official name. First Interstate Tower North was built adjacent to the pre-existing First Interstate Tower South, now known as 621 17th Street, which rises  in height.  The two buildings together form the First of Denver Plaza.

Exterior shots of the building were used in the opening credits of the television series Dynasty

See also
List of tallest buildings in Denver

References

Skyscraper office buildings in Denver
Office buildings completed in 1974